Artificial consciousness is about theoretical aspects of approaching consciousness in an engineered artifact.

Artificial consciousness may also refer to:

Simulated consciousness (science fiction)